Hetty Esther Verolme (born 24 February 1930 in Antwerp, Belgium) is an Australian writer, educator and Holocaust survivor. She now lives in Australia.

Verolme has written about her experiences as a child in Bergen-Belsen. She is a recipient of the Australian "Most Successful Migrant" award.

Early/personal life

Moving with family 
In 1931 the Werkendam family moved to Amsterdam from Antwerp. Eight years later, World War II broke out and May 1940 the Germans occupied the Netherlands.

WWII 
In 1943, when Verolme was 12 years old, the Werkendam family was transported first to the Westerbork camp for a short stay, then to the Bergen-Belsen concentration camp. At Bergen-Belsen, Verolme and her brothers, Max and Jack, were sent to Barrack 211, also known as the Children's House.

Sister Luba, a Polish prisoner, saved the children and took full responsibility for the group. Due to Verolme's age, she was tasked with supervising the small children there. She became known as 'Little Mother'.

Food and water was very limited and the conditions of the barracks were poor. Hetty relied on other children who were older for support and good spirits amongst the growing number of children. Sister Luba had other ladies to help her protect the children; however, many died. Their bodies were piled up on a mound right outside the Children's house.

When World War II was in its last months, the camp experienced a typhus epidemic.  Verolme fell sick, but survived. In April 1945, the British Army liberated Bergen-Belsen.

Experiences/death of family and friends 
On Friday 2 October 1942 at 8:15 am, Verolme's grandmother, grandfather and cousin were taken away and killed. Verolme's school boyfriend and her school friend Sonia Santiel both were murdered in Auschwitz on 22 October in 1943. Later, two of her uncles, Philip Van Kamerik and Max Werkendam (b. 1917), were murdered in Bergen-Belsen.

Verolme lost over 110 Werkendam family members during the Holocaust, spread through many work and death camps. As recently as 2015, names are still emerging of relatives who were murdered.

Post WWII 
After the war, Verolme and her brothers were reunited with their parents. With assistance from the Red Cross organisation, the family moved back to the Netherlands. As an adult, Verolme built a successful career in the fashion industry.

In 1954, Verolme emigrated to Australia. Once there, she worked as a waitress, bus conductress, door-to-door sales person, real estate agent and a shopping centre developer.

Verolme became the first female president of the Netherlands Society in Adelaide and was on charity committees such as the Lady Mayoress's Committee and later worked with the Ethnic Affairs Council. She is a founding Trustee of Children of Belsen and The Holocaust Trust, formed to help holocaust survivors, their descendants and promote the continued awareness of the Holocaust.

Awards and achievements

Awards in Australia 
 1972 - Awarded "Most Successful Migrant"
 1977 - By Ministerial appointment, into the Inaugural Australian Ethnic Affairs Council 
 2000 - Christina Stead Award - The Fellowship of Australian Writers

Achievements 
Migrated to Australia in 1954
 A founding member of the Australian Ethnic Affairs Council in Canberra - along with the Hon Al Grasby.
 President of the Netherlands Society in South Australia.
 Was a Member of the Lady Mayoress Committee in South Australia.
 Noted in the Who's Who of Australian Women.
 Devoted to a wide variety of charity and community organisations

Published works

References

External links 
 The Children of Belsen Trust
 Hetty: A true story at Fremantlepress.com.au

1930 births
Living people
Dutch Jews
The Holocaust in the Netherlands
Bergen-Belsen concentration camp survivors
Dutch emigrants to Australia
Australian writers
Jewish women writers